"The Soup" is the 93rd episode of the NBC sitcom Seinfeld. This was the seventh episode of the sixth season. It aired on November 10, 1994. The character Kenny Bania (played by Stephen Hytner) made his first appearance in the episode, in which he tries to cultivate friendship with Jerry by giving him an Armani suit. Meanwhile, George becomes uncomfortable at Monk's Café after he has an awkward first date with a waitress there, leading him and his circle of friends to try eating at one of their competitors.

Plot
Kelly, a waitress from Monk's Café, flirts with George. At Jerry's goading, he takes her out for a walk. George describes how he likes the word "manure", and Kelly makes a casual remark revealing that she has a boyfriend. Later, Jerry and George speculate whether she made that up to avoid George and whether the manure comment had anything to do with it.

After having a kidney stone, Kramer decides to dump his refrigerator and eat only fresh foods. He starts dating Hildy, a waitress at Reggie's, and her appetite forces him to raid Jerry's apartment for food. Kenny Bania gives Jerry a brand-new Armani suit, but insists Jerry should buy him a meal in exchange. Jerry and Bania meet up at Mendy's restaurant for the agreed-upon meal, but Bania only orders soup, which, he says, cannot count as the "meal". Elaine has just returned from a trip to England with Mr. Pitt. While there, she met Simon, and has flown him back with her frequent-flyer miles. However, he becomes arrogant and doesn't have plans to return to England.

Bania joins George and Jerry at Monk's; this time he orders a sandwich. Jerry insists his obligation is fulfilled, overruling Bania's protests that they didn't eat in a fancy restaurant. Jerry is so overcome with disgust for Bania's manipulation that he gives the Armani suit to Simon. George feels uncomfortable in Monk's, because the playful banter he enjoyed with Kelly before has been replaced on her part with a cold formality that borders on rudeness. After asking Hildy, Kramer informs George that Kelly doesn't have a boyfriend. George badgers Jerry and Elaine to go to Reggie's. They find Reggie's does not offer the meals they have grown accustomed to at Monk's.

At his apartment, Jerry is out of food for Hildy, who is in a bad mood because she got fired after Kramer made too many calls to her workplace. George decides to try the same trick with Kelly, reasoning that Kelly is the one who should have to leave because he had been going to Monk's far longer than she had been working there.

Back at Monk's, Kelly informs Jerry and Elaine that she isn't going to work there anymore. Her boss, fed up with calls, bans George from Monk's. Bania attempts to reclaim the suit from Jerry. Simon arrives to announce that he has a job interview and is a shoo-in thanks to the suit Jerry gave him, so he will be staying in the country indefinitely. As he's leaving, Elaine tells Bania where his suit is, and a heated Bania rushes outside to attack Simon. Jerry and Elaine salute each other in triumph, while George has no option but to eat by himself at Reggie's.

Production
The walk scene in Central Park was filmed at the CBS Radford lagoon, best known as the set for Gilligan's Island.

Sequences which were filmed but deleted prior to broadcast include George giving Kramer advice on asking Hildy out, George confronting the manager at Reggie's in an attempt to persuade him to add their favorite meals to the menu, Hildy breaking up with Kramer over his inability to keep her fed, and Kenny Bania revealing he asked Kelly out as soon as she gave her notice at Monk's, since he wanted to avoid precisely the situation George ended up in in the episode.

References

External links 
 

Seinfeld (season 6) episodes
1994 American television episodes